Dunstable North was a railway station on the London and North Western Railway's branch line from Leighton Buzzard which served Dunstable in Bedfordshire from 1848 to 1967. Originally the terminus of the London and North Western Railway's branch line from Leighton Buzzard, Dunstable became the point where the line met with the Great Northern's branch line from Luton in 1858. The station became the hub of a number of sidings connecting a variety of concerns to the line, including Waterlows, Bedfordshire County Council, Associated Portland Cement, Dunstable gasworks and a coal yard operated by the Great Northern. Against a background of falling passenger numbers and declining freight returns, the station closed to passengers in 1965 and to goods in 1967. Connections were retained with the cement works and coal yard, which became an oil depot, until 1988 and the line eventually closed in 1991. The site of the station is now occupied by offices of Central Bedfordshire Council (previously the headquarters of South Bedfordshire District Council). A section of the former line to the west of the site has become part of route 6 of the National Cycle Network.

History

The proposals were devised by George and Robert Stephenson. The line opened for freight on 29 May 1848 and to passengers on 1 June. A station was opened beside the A5 Watling Street. It was constructed almost on the level with the road to allow a connection to be made with the Luton, Dunstable and Welwyn Junction Railway which opened a line between Dunstable and Luton in May 1858. A solution was found whereby the original Dunstable station would be reconstructed at a higher level to allow the road to be crossed by a bridge, whilst also lowering the road level to allow sufficient clearance. This was accepted and a new station opened in January 1866. The delay in opening the new station was caused by protracted negotiations between the two railway companies as to who would bear the costs of construction. In the event, it was the London and North Western Railway, which had absorbed the Dunstable & London & Birmingham Railway.

The new Dunstable station had two platforms and a bay; the Down platform was used by  trains (the extension from Luton to Hatfield was completed in 1860), the bay was used for Leighton services and the Up platform was, it is believed, used as a run-round loop. The site of the original Dunstable station became the goods yard. This yard saw large quantities of coal and fertiliser traffic, in addition to general traffic. To the south of the yard lay the town's gasworks which were served by sidings, whilst to the west was a signal box which controlled access to the yard as well as the level crossing over Brewer's Hill Road. A rail-served Bedfordshire County Council depot was situated on the other side of the level crossing immediately to the north of the running lines. Other sidings served Waterlow's printing works, the Great Northern coal yard from 1871, and the Associated Portland Cement works at Houghton Regis from 1925. Due to subsidence a new 50-lever signal box replaced the LNWR one from 16 August 1958; it was only to have a short life as closure came just over a decade later on 23 March 1969. At this time the station was still lit by gas lamps.

Passenger traffic over the Dunstable branch in its later years was not great except on market days, and Dunstable North, as it became after 1950, was closed to passengers in 1965 and to goods in 1967. The line to Leighton Buzzard closed from 1 January 1966, with tracklifting at Dunstable beginning in 1968. The former Great Northern coal yard became an oil storage depot in October 1968 which, together with the cement works, was served by between one and three trains daily. The section of line across the A5 bridge was closed in 1969 as it had cracked and the costs of replacement were not justified by the line's remaining traffic. The remaining sidings were disconnected and the signal box closed and demolished. A new loop line was laid between Waterlow's siding and the cement works to provide a run-around. From 1971 the coal for the cement works was shifted to road and the rail connection was limited to the distribution of cement products. Cement and oil traffic continued until 1988 and closure of the line was authorised from 16 December 1991.

Present day
The station has been demolished and is now the site of offices of Central Bedfordshire Council (previously the headquarters of South Bedfordshire District Council). The route is part of National Cycle Network route 6 and includes a bridge over the A505.

References

Sources

External links
BBC feature on Dunstable's railways.
Recent images of the remains of the line between Leighton Buzzard to Dunstable.
Pre-bypass images of the line.
Dunstable North station on navigable 1946 O. S. map.
Photographs of removal of rail bridge near Dunstable North Station.

Disused railway stations in Bedfordshire
Former London and North Western Railway stations
Railway stations in Great Britain opened in 1848
Railway stations in Great Britain closed in 1965
Transport in Luton/Dunstable Urban Area
Dunstable
Beeching closures in England
1866 establishments in England